Agnese Dolci (1635 – 1686) was an Italian painter and the daughter of Carlo Dolci.

Little is known of her life. Works by her are mostly attributed to her father or are called copies after her father. Two paintings Jesus took bread and blessed it and Maria and Child were included in the 1905 book Women Painters of the World.

References

 Agnese Dolci on artnet

1635 births
1686 deaths
17th-century Italian painters
Italian women painters
17th-century Italian women artists